Louviers, also known as Upper Louviers and Black Gates, was a historic home located at Wilmington in New Castle County, Delaware.

History
The original section was built in 1833 as a two-story stone dwelling measuring 31 feet, 8 inches wide and 35 feet long. Additions were made in 1833, 1837, after 1837, and after 1901. The second addition included a third floor and a facade with a Greek Revival style porch.

From 1837 to 1865, it was the home of Rear Admiral Samuel Francis Du Pont, a member of the prominent Du Pont family. Also located on the property are contributing gate houses, and an iron bridge (1877) that joined Louviers to the powder yards.

It was added to the National Register of Historic Places in 1971. The house has since been demolished, and its site incorporated into the DuPont Country Club. However, the gate houses along Rockland Road and the iron bridge over the Brandywine remain.

See also
Lower Louviers and Chicken Alley

References

Du Pont family residences
Houses on the National Register of Historic Places in Delaware
Gothic Revival architecture in Delaware
Houses completed in 1833
Houses in Wilmington, Delaware
National Register of Historic Places in Wilmington, Delaware